{{DISPLAYTITLE:CH4N2O}}
The molecular formula CH4N2O (molar mass: 60.06 g/mol, exact mass: 60.03236 u) may refer to:

 Urea, or carbamide
 Ammonium cyanate
 Formylhydrazine